Times Square is a 1929 American drama film directed by Joseph Boyle and starring Alice Day, Arthur Lubin and Emile Chautard. It was released in both silent and sound versions and was shot in Los Angeles and New York.

Cast
 Alice Day as Elaine Smith 
 Arthur Lubin as Russ Glover / Benjamin Lederwitski 
 Emile Chautard as David Lederwitski 
 Ann Brody as Sarah Lederwitski 
 John Miljan as Dick Barclay 
 Arthur Housman as Lon Roberts 
 Josef Swickard as Professor Carrillo 
 Natalie Joyce as Lida 
 Eddie Kane as Nat Ross

References

Bibliography
 Samantha Cook. Writers and production artists. St James Press, 1993.

External links
 

1929 films
1929 drama films
1920s English-language films
Films directed by Joseph Boyle
American black-and-white films
Gotham Pictures films
1920s American films